The list of ship launches in 1994 includes a chronological list of all ships launched in 1994.

References

1994
1994 in transport